The Canadian Public Policy is a quarterly peer-reviewed academic journal examining economic and social policy. It is published by the University of Toronto Press on behalf of the Canadian Association for Information Science.

Abstracting and indexing
The journal is abstracted and indexed in:
EBSCO databases
EconLit
International Bibliography of Book Reviews of Scholarly Literature on the Humanities and Social Sciences
International Political Science Abstracts/Documentation Politique Internationale
Journal of Economic Literature
RePEc
Scopus

References

External links

University of Toronto Press academic journals
Quarterly journals
Publications established in 1974
English-language journals